Christmas Songs is the eighth studio album by Canadian singer Diana Krall, performed with The Clayton/Hamilton Jazz Orchestra. It was released on October 26, 2005, by Verve Records. This is Krall's first full-length album of Christmas songs (not counting her 1998 EP Have Yourself a Merry Little Christmas), and her first studio album with a big band. The album was released on vinyl for the first time on October 14, 2016.

Critical reception

Tad Hendrickson of JazzTimes stated, "Krall gets a ton of help on her Christmas album from the well-drilled Clayton–Hamilton Jazz Orchestra as well as from the usual peeps in her own bands. The singer doesn't work too hard to sell it, preferring to stay in the pocket, and the solos are short all the way around, but it all sounds swingin', fun and jazzy". John Bungey of The Times noted, "If your idea of a perfect Yuletide is Jimmy Stewart on the telly and Bing on the radio, and you believe that, musically, it's all been downhill since 1955, then Krall's album will suit perfectly".

Dave Gelly and Nail Spenser of The Observer wrote, "If you feared the worst after hearing Diana Krall's last, rather droopy CD you can cheer up, because this one proves she hasn't forgotten how to swing after all. Corny idea or not, it is a terrific jazz-vocal album that will raise your spirits now and for several Christmases to come".

Track listing

Personnel
Credits adapted from the liner notes of Christmas Songs.

Musicians

 Diana Krall – vocals ; piano solo ; piano ; arrangement 
 Jeff Clayton – alto saxophone solo ; flute solo 
 Ira Nepus – trombone solo 
 Anthony Wilson – guitar ; guitar solo 
 John Clayton – bass ; arrangement 
 Jeff Hamilton – drums 
 Rickey Woodard – tenor saxophone solo 
 Ben Wolfe – bass 
 Russell Malone – guitar 
 Assa Drori – concertmaster 
 Jules Chaikin – orchestra contractor 
 Gerald Clayton – piano 
 Stefon Harris – vibes 
 Tamir Hendelman – Fender Rhodes ; piano 
 Gilbert Castellanos – trumpet solo 
 George Bohanon – trombone solo 
 Alan Broadbent – piano 
 Randy Waldman – keyboards 
 Robert Hurst – bass 
 Emil Richards – percussion 
 Johnny Mandel – arrangement, conducting

The Clayton/Hamilton Jazz Orchestra

 Jeff Hamilton – drums
 Robert Hurst – bass
 Anthony Wilson – guitar
 Gerald Clayton – piano 
 Tamir Hendelman – piano ; Fender Rhodes 
 Jeff Clayton – lead alto saxophone, flute
 Keith Fiddmont – alto saxophone, clarinet
 Rickey Woodard – tenor saxophone solos, tenor saxophone, clarinet
 Charles Owens – tenor saxophone, clarinet
 Adam Schroeder – baritone saxophone, bass clarinet
 Rick Baptist, Sal Cracchiolo, Clay Jenkins, Gilberto Gilbert Castellanos, William Barnhart – trumpets
 Ira Nepus, George Bohanon, Ryan Porter – trombones
 Tommy Johnson – tuba
 Rick Todd, David Duke, Joe Meyer, Brad Warnaar – French horns
 Joe Porcaro – percussion

Technical

 Tommy LiPuma – production ; co-production 
 Diana Krall – production 
 Johnny Mandel – co-production 
 Al Schmitt – recording, mixing
 Steve Genewick – engineering assistance, Pro Tools
 Koji Egawa – engineering assistance
 Bill Smith – engineering assistance
 Brian Vibberts – engineering assistance
 Dave Swope – engineering assistance
 Doug Sax – mastering at The Mastering Lab, Ojai, California

Artwork
 Hollis King – art direction
 Coco Shinomiya – design
 Sam Taylor-Wood – photography

Charts

Weekly charts

Year-end charts

Decade-end charts

Certifications

Notes

See also
 List of Billboard Top Holiday Albums number ones of the 2000s

References

2005 Christmas albums
Albums arranged by Johnny Mandel
Albums produced by Diana Krall
Albums produced by Tommy LiPuma
Albums recorded at Capitol Studios
Christmas albums by Canadian artists
Collaborative albums
Covers albums
Diana Krall albums
Jazz Christmas albums
Juno Award for Vocal Jazz Album of the Year albums
Verve Records albums